M. Nurul Islam (2 May 1934 – 21 October 2020) was a Bangladesh Nationalist Party politician and the former Member of Parliament of Khulna-4.

Early life 
Islam was born on 2 May 1934 in Khulna, Khulna District, East Bengal, British India.

Career
Islam was elected to parliament from Khulna-4 as a Bangladesh Nationalist Party candidate in 2001.

Death 
Islam died on 21 October 2020 in Khulna City Medical College and Hospital.

References

Bangladesh Nationalist Party politicians
8th Jatiya Sangsad members
People from Khulna District
6th Jatiya Sangsad members
1934 births
2020 deaths